Palestinian Australians are Australian citizens of Palestinian origin or Palestinian immigrants who live in Australia. There are an estimated 7,000 Palestinians in Australia.

History
Like much of the Palestinian diaspora worldwide, many Palestinian migrants came from displaced backgrounds as part of a massive exodus of refugees and as a result of decades of war. The majority of Palestinians arrived to Australia holding passports of other Arab countries in which they had initially settled following their emigration from Palestine; it was not uncommon for different families to hold passports of different countries. 

The 1967 Israeli-Arab war led many Palestinians to seek migration beyond the Arab world. Migration waves continued to surge following the Lebanese Civil War 1975 to 1990. The latest major wave came in the aftermath of the 1991 Gulf War.

Demographics
Most Palestinians speak the Arabic language and are counted as Arab Australians.

Notable people
 Randa Abdel-Fattah
 Sheikh Shady Alsuleiman
 Joe Hockey
 Munif Mohammed Abou Rish
 Loudy Wiggins
 Samah Sabawi

See also

 Al-Kateb v Godwin

References

External links
 Australian Palestinian Professionals Association

 
Immigration to Australia
Australia